Anabel Medina Garrigues and Virginia Ruano Pascual were the defending champions, and successfully defended their title, defeating Victoria Azarenka and Elena Vesnina in the final 6–1, 6–1.

Seeds

Draw

Finals

Top half

Section 1

Section 2

Bottom half

Section 3

Section 4

External links
Draw
2009 French Open – Women's draws and results at the International Tennis Federation

Women's Doubles
French Open by year – Women's doubles
2009 in women's tennis
2009 in French women's sport